Charles Payne may refer to:

 Charles Payne (clergyman) (1830–1899), Methodist clergyman and president of Ohio Wesleyan University
 Charles Payne (television personality) (born 1960), American Fox Business Network contributor and co-host of Varney & Co.
 Charles Payne (cricketer, born 1827) (1827–1859), English clergyman and cricketer
 Charles Payne (cricketer, born 1832) (1832–1909), English cricketer
 Charles Payne (Australian cricketer) (1876–1938), Australian cricketer
 Charles M. Payne (born 1948), American academic
 Charles T. Payne (1925–2014), great uncle of US President Barack Obama
 C. M. Payne (1873–1964), American cartoonist
 Sir Charles Payne, 1st Baronet (died 1738), of the Payne baronets
 Sir Charles Gillies Payne, 4th Baronet (1793–1870), of the Payne baronets
 Sir Charles Robert Salusbury Payne, 6th Baronet (1859–1942), of the Payne baronets
 Charlie Payne (born 1944), former Australian rules footballer

See also
 Charles Paine (disambiguation)